The fictional shared universe of Thieves' World has many characters. This alphabetic list includes some characters who appear in the anthologies, the comics and the games.

 Abarsis, Slaughter Priest; high priest of Vashanka. Originally the Sacred Band's commander, Abarsis later became the patron shade of the Sacred Band of Stepsons once Tempus assumed command of the Band upon Abarsis's death.
 Askelon, entelechy of dreams, regent of the seventh sphere, lord of dream and shadow, ruled in Meridian until defeated by Tempus and the Sacred Band of Stepsons in battle.
 Bourne, member of the Prince's Bodyguard
 Cappen Varra, minstrel, lover, and occasional accidental adventurer
 Cime, sorcerer-slayer. Some say she is Tempus's sister, some his beloved. Tempus and she were lovers when young and have shared curses. She was married for a time to Askelon, lord of dream and shadow.
 Critias, at one time second-in-command of Tempus's Stepsons and Sacred Band; Crit is Straton's partner and left-side leader or leftman.
 Dubro the Blackmith, husband of Illyra.
 Enas Yorl, wizard and involuntary shapechanger (he lost a duel with another wizard)
 Enlil, ancient god of storm and wind, patron god of Tempus and the Sacred Band of Stepsons after Vashanka went missing
 Hakiem the storyteller, a street dweller who tells tales and trades information in exchange for coins
 Illyra, half S'danzo seer
 Ischade, necromant and lover of Straton when he commanded the Sacred Band of Stepsons
 Jamie the Red, an adventurer who aids Cappen Varra in rescuing his lover from a magical plane.
 Janni, Niko's right-side partner, killed by the witch Roxanne and made an undead by the necromant Ischade.
Jarveena, a Yenized scribe who makes a deal with Enas Yorl to foil the assassination of Prince Kadakithis.
 Jihan, wind-charmer and supernatural sprite, daughter of Stormbringer, father of all weather gods; sometime consort of Tempus, she bore his child.
 Jubal, ex-gladiator turned slave trader and crime lord
 Kadakithis, Prince-Governor. Sent to Sanctuary by his half-brother the Emperor in a plot to remove him from power.
 Kurd the vivisectionist
 Kama, Tempus's daughter and a member of the Rankan 3rd Commando; she later served in Tempus's forces.
 Lalo the Limner, a painter who receives the "gift" of being able to paint the souls of his subjects
 Lythande, a female wizard of the Blue Star order, masquerading in Sanctuary as a man
 Molin Torchholder, High Priest of Vashanka in Sanctuary
 MoonFlower, S'danzo seer
Myrtis, owner of Aphrodisia House, Sanctuary's longest-standing brothel, who has a close friendship with Lythande
 Nikodemos, or Niko; most deadly of the Stepsons, Tempus's right-side partner.  Always a Sacred Bander, Niko has had several partners, including Janni, who was killed; Randal, the Stepsons' mage, and later Tempus himself.  Askelon of Meridian gave him a magical panoply.
 One-Thumb (Lastel), bartender of the Vulgar Unicorn.
 Razkuli, member of the Prince's Bodyguard
 Randal, upwardly-mobile mage with plaguing allergies; at one time, by Tempus's order, rightman of the Stepson and Sacred Bander, Nikodemos. Randal has a kris made for him by the dream-lord, Askelon.
 Roxane, the fearsome Nisibisi witch who loves Nikodemos
 Saliman, Jubal's right-hand man
 The Sacred Band, commanded first by Abarsis and later by Tempus, consisted originally of ten age-weighted couples and became members of Tempus's Stepsons, which initially included thirty single mercenaries and grew to over three hundred and fifty fighters in later novels.
 Shadowspawn (Hanse), a thief who forms an unlikely friendship with Prince Kadakithis. Later retires due to a stroke and trains a young thief named Lone.
 The Stepsons, general term for the paired fighters and individual mercenaries commanded by Tempus; later called The Sacred Band of Stepsons.  All Stepsons were not required to be Sacred Band couples; some were single mercenaries or Platonic couples.
 Straton, Critias' right-side partner, onetime commander of the Sacred Band of Stepsons in Sanctuary.
 Tempus, immortal warrior and leader of the Sacred Band and the Stepsons, his legend says he is a demigod.
 Vashanka, Rankan God of War
 Zalbar, Captain of the Prince's Bodyguard
 Zip, revolutionary and terrorist, sometime lover of Kama

Literature lists
Thieves' World